Taphead may refer to:
Taphead, a Spinal Tap fan
Taphead, a Talk Talk song from their 1991 album Laughing Stock
Taphead, a Stars of the Lid song from their 1997 album The Ballasted Orchestra